Adélaïde de Clermont-Tonnerre (born 20 March 1976) is a French journalist and author.

Biography
Adélaïde de Clermont-Tonnerre was born in Neuilly-sur-Seine, France in 20 March 1976, a descendant of Princess Isabelle d’Orléans. She won five literary prizes for her first novel and was a finalist for the Goncourt prize for début fiction. Her second novel won the Grand Prix du Roman in 2016.

Clermont-Tonnerre attended the Ecole Normale Supérieure though she didn't complete. She worked in investment banking in France and Mexico. Clermont-Tonnerre then became a columnist and journalist, currently working as the section editor on Point de Vue.

Works
 Fourrure, Éditions Stock, 2010, 
 Le dernier des nôtres, Éditions Grasset, 2016 
 Translated by Adriana Hunter as The Last of Our Kind, Hodder & Stoughton, 2018, 
 Les Jours heureux, Éditions Grasset, 2021,

Sources

1976 births
Living people
People from Neuilly-sur-Seine
French women journalists
French journalists
Grand Prix du roman de l'Académie française winners